The Jászai Mari Award is a state award, which was created by the Hungarian government in 1953 as an award for theatrical arts. The award was named in honour of the Hungarian actress Mari Jászai.

It originally ran, from 1955 to 1976, and was awarded in April. In 1992  the Hungarian Minister of National Cultural Heritage revived the award.

Bibliography

 Díjasok és kitüntetettek adattára 1948–1980. Összeállította és szerkesztette: Magyar Józsefné. Palmiro Togliatti Megyei Könyvtár, Kaposvár. 
 Csapó Tamásné: Díjasok és kitüntetettek adattára 1981–1990. Megyei és Városi Könyvtár, Kaposvár. 
 MTI Ki kicsoda 2009. Szerk. Hermann Péter. Budapest: Magyar Távirati Iroda. 2008.

References

Awards established in 1953
1953 establishments in Hungary
Performing arts trophies
1992 establishments in Hungary